The Sheldon spectrum is an observed phenomenon of marine life that demonstrates an inverse correlation between the size of an organism and its abundance in the ocean.  The spectrum is named after Ray Sheldon, a marine ecologist at Canada’s Bedford Institute of Oceanography in Dartmouth, Nova Scotia who first reported on this finding in the late 1960s.

The rule observed is that biomass density as a function of logarithmic body mass is approximately constant over many orders of magnitude.  For example, krill are a billion times smaller than tuna, but they are a billion times more abundant in the ocean.  When Sheldon and his colleagues analyzed their plankton samples by size, they observed that each size bracket contained the same mass of creatures.  In a bucket of seawater, for example, one third of the plankton mass would be between 1 and 10 micrometers, another third would be between 10 and 100 micrometers, and a third would be between 100 micrometers and 1 millimeter.  To make up for the discrepancy of size, there would be a remarkably accurate mathematically correlative increase in number of organisms, so that the biomass would remain constant.

There is concern that human behavior, such as overfishing and water pollution have modified the Sheldon spectrum for larger species, and it is unknown what long term effects such global alteration will have.

References

Marine organisms
Planktology
Marine biology